José Rizalino de León Torre (born June 19, 1961), professionally known as Joel Torre, is a Filipino actor and producer who is best known for his numerous films such as the biographical film José Rizal (1998), crime thriller film  On the Job (2013) and the historical drama Amigo (2010), with the latter winning him the Best Actor Award at the 17th Puchon International Fantastic Film Festival.

Torre studied at the University of St. La Salle in Bacolod, Philippines. The Dr. Pablo O. Torre Memorial Hospital of Bacolod City was named in honor of Torre's uncle.

Early career
At age seven, Torre was a member of the Bacolod-based Masskara theater group ran by director Peque Gallaga, where his passion for acting started. He was the youngest member in the group which composed of 13 people. He then played a small role in Lino Brocka's Gumising ka, Maruja which was shot in Bacolod in 1978. A few years later, Gallaga tasked Torre to play a role for his 1982 film Oro, Plata, Mata.

Personal life
Torre's middle name, Rizalino, comes from the fact that he was born exactly 100 years after Filipino national hero José Rizal. Torre is married to Christy Azcona in 1990 and had a daughter together.

Filmography

Television

Web

Films

Kabisera (2013)
The Diplomat Hotel (2013)
Juana C. the Movie (2013) 
Mariposa: Sa Hawla ng Gabi (2012) 
Huling Biyahe (2012) 
Captive(2012) 
Flight of an Angel (2011)
Deep Gold 3D (2011)
Sabungero (2009)
Surviving Evil (2009)
Affliction (2008)
Green Paradise (2007)
Casket for Hire (2007)
Possessed (2007)
Baliw (2007)
Ina, Anak, Pamilya (2006)
Umaaraw, Umuulan (2006)
Hari ng Sablay: Isang tama, sampung mali (2005)
Beneath the Cogon (2005)
Rigodon (2005)
Ang Anak ni Brocka (2005)
Say That You Love Me (2005)
Camiling Story (2005)
Lasponggols (2005)
Pinoy/Blonde (2005)
Boso (2005)
Kuya (2004)
Ang Kapitbahay (2003)
Chavit (2003)
Abong: Small Home (2003)
First Time (2003)
Sanib (2003)
Utang ni Tatang (2002)
Taxi ni Pilo (2001)
Batang West Side (2001)
Anak (2000)
Bayaning 3rd World (1999)
Still Lives (1999)
Kiss Mo 'Ko (1999)
Hubad sa Ilalim ng Buwan
Seventeen (1999)
Berdugo (1998)
Ilaban Mo, Bayan Ko: The Obet Pagdanganan Story (1997)
Maalaala Mo Kaya (1997)
Puerto Princesa (1997)
Tirad Pass: The Story of Gen. Gregorio del Pilar (1997)
Nakaw Na Sandali (1997)
Ilaban Mo Bayan Ko (1997)
Wala Na Bang Pag-ibig? (1997)
Milagros (1997)
DNA (1997)
Nasaan Ka nang Kailangan Kita (1996)
Mumbaki (1996)
Sana Naman (1996)
Victim No. 1: Delia Maga (Jesus, Pray for Us!) (1995)
Redeem Her Honor (1995)
Rollerboys (1995)
Bocaue Pagoda Tragedy (1995)
The Lilian Velez Story: Till Death Do Us Part (1995)
Eskapo (1995)
Asian Cop: High Voltage (1995)
Tunay na magkaibigan, walang iwanan... peksman (1994)
Lipa 'Arandia' Massacre: Lord, Deliver Us from Evil (1994)
Comfort Women: A Cry for Justice (1994)
The Myrna Diones Story (Lord, Have Mercy!) (1993)
Maricris Sioson: Japayuki (1993)
Leonardo Delos Reyes: Alyas Waway (1993)
Pandoy: Alalay ng Panday (1993)
Noli Me Tángere (1992)
Matud Nila (1991)
Shake, Rattle & Roll III (1991)
McBain
Kasalanan ang Buhayin Ka (1990)
Machete: Istatwang buhay (1990)
Mana sa ina
Kunin mo ang ulo ni Ismael (1990)
First Lesson (1989)
Mahirap ang magmahal (1989)
Anak ng demonyo (1989)
Magkano ang iyong dangal? (1988)
Arturo Lualhati (1988)
Isusumbong kita sa Diyos (1988)
Hiwaga sa Balete Drive (1988)
Olongapo... The Great American Dream (1987)
Susuko ba ako, inay? (1987)
Once Upon a Time (1987)
Saan Nagkamali Ang Pag-ibig (1987)
Evelio (1986)
Bilanggo sa Dilim (1986)
I Love You Mama, I Love You Papa (1986)
The Graduates
Unfaithful Wife (1986)
Bagong Hari (1986)'
Bed Sins (1985)
Beware: Bed Sins (1985)
Isla (1985)
Shake, Rattle & Roll (1984)
Batgts 2
Hindi Mo Ako Kayang Tapakan (1984)
Of the Flesh (1983) 
Init sa Magdamag (1983) 
Oro, Plata, Mata (1982)
Wake Up, Maruja  (1978)

Music video appearances

Awards
Celebrity Inductee, 2013 Eastwood City Walk Of Fame
Nominated, Best Drama Actor "Boracay" PMPC Star Awards For TV 1991

References

External links

1961 births
Living people
Filipino male comedians
Filipino male television actors
Male actors from Negros Occidental
People from Bacolod
University of St. La Salle alumni
Visayan people
Filipino male film actors
GMA Network personalities
ABS-CBN personalities